Robert Linsley (1952–2017) was a Canadian artist, writer and professor known for his abstract paintings.

Early life and education
Linsley was born in 1952 in Winnipeg, Manitoba. He received a BFA degree in 1982 and a MFA degree in 1988 from the University of British Columbia.

Career
His book Beyond Resemblance Abstract Art in the Age of Global Conceptualism was published in 2017 by Reaktion Books. Linsley's work is included in the collections of the Vancouver Art Gallery, the Edmonton Art Gallery and the Morris and Helen Belkin Art Gallery at the University of British Columbia.

Linsley died in a bicycle accident in Kitchener-Waterloo, Ontario in 2017.

References

1952 births
2017 deaths
Artists from Winnipeg
Canadian abstract artists
Canadian male non-fiction writers
21st-century Canadian male writers
21st-century Canadian non-fiction writers
Writers from Winnipeg
21st-century Canadian artists